Richard Stilwell may refer to:

Richard Stilwell (bass-baritone) (born 1942), American opera singer and vocal instructor
Richard G. Stilwell (1917–1991), commander of American military forces in the Battle of Hamburger Hill